Hibiscus rosa-sinensis, known colloquially as Chinese hibiscus, China rose, Hawaiian hibiscus, rose mallow and shoeblack plant, is a species of tropical hibiscus, a flowering plant in the Hibisceae tribe of the family Malvaceae. It is widely cultivated as an ornamental plant in the tropics and subtropics, but its native range is Vanuatu.

Description

Tree and leaves 
The plant has a branched taproot. Its stem is aerial, erect, green, cylindrical, and branched.

Its leaves are simple and petiolate, with alternate phyllotaxy. The leaf shape is ovate, the tip is acute, and the margin is serrated. Venation is unicostate reticulate, meaning the leaves' veins are branched or divergent. Its surface is glossy. Free lateral stipules are present.

Flowers 
Its flowers bloom in summer and autumn. They are solitary (axillary) and symmetrical. They are typically red, with five petals  in diameter, with prominent orange-tipped red anthers. Cultivars and hybrids have flowers in a variety of colors as well as red: white, pink, orange, peach, yellow, blue, and purple. Some plants have double flowers.

At the bottom of every hibiscus bud is the calyx, which is green in color. The pointed ends of the calyx are called the sepals. When the hibiscus begins to bloom, the flower's petals begin to grow. 

Each hibiscus flower has both male and female parts. The ovary and other female parts of the flower lie in the main structure of the hibiscus: the pistil, which is long and tubular. The five "hairy" spots at the top of the pistil make up the stigma, which is where pollen is collected. In the middle of the pistil is the style, which is the tube down which pollen travels to the ovary. The ovary lies at the bottom of the blossom, and each hibiscus has only one superior ovary. The male part of the flower, called the stamen, consists of stem-like filaments and anthers. Each filament ends with the pollen-producing anther.

Taxonomy 
Hibiscus rosa-sinensis was first described in 1753 by Carl Linnaeus in Species Plantarum. The specific epithet rosa-sinensis literally means "rose of China", although the plant is not closely related to true roses, nor is it from China. The genus Hibiscus is in the tribe Hibisceae and the subfamily Malvoideae of the family Malvaceae.

Ecology 
Despite its size and colorful hues which are typically attractive to nectarivore birds, the flowers of Hibiscus rosa-sinensis are not visited regularly by hummingbirds when grown in the Neotropics. Generalist species, like the sapphire-spangled emerald (Amazilia lactea), or long-billed species, like the stripe-breasted starthroat (Heliomaster squamosus) are occasionally seen to visit the flowers. In the subtropical and temperate Americas, hummingbirds are regularly attracted to hibiscus.

The endangered Papilio homerus butterfly, the largest in the western hemisphere, is known to feed on the nectar of the Hibiscus rosa-sinensis.

Genetics 
Hibiscus rosa-sinensis is one of many plant species with a genetic characteristic known as polyploidy, a condition in which the species has more than two complete sets of chromosomes. A result of polyploidy is that the phenotype of a plant's offspring may be quite different from the parent plant, or indeed any ancestor, essentially allowing possibly random expression of any (or all) of the characteristics of previous generations. Because of this characteristic, H. rosa-sinensis has become popular with hobbyists who cross and recross varieties, creating new varieties. Competitions are held to exhibit and judge the many resulting new seedlings and often strikingly unique flowers.

Uses 

The flowers of Hibiscus rosa-sinensis are edible and are used in salads in the Pacific Islands. The flower is used as an accessory, particularly as a hairpiece. It is also used to shine shoes in certain parts of India, hence the common name "shoeblack plant". In Indonesia and Malaysia, these flowers are called "kembang sepatu" or "bunga sepatu", which literally means "shoe flower". The flower can also be used as a pH indicator; when used, the flower turns acidic solutions to a dark pink or magenta color and turns basic solutions to green. Red hibiscus flowers are also used for worship; in Hinduism, they are used for the worship of Devi, and in the Bengal area of eastern India, they are used to worship Kali. The hibiscus also has an important part in tantra.  In several countries the flowers are dried to use in a beverage, usually tea.

Hibiscus rosa-sinensis is considered to have a number of medical uses in Chinese herbology. Traditional uses in China have been to make a black shoe-polish from its flower petals, or to make a woman's black hair dye. The flowers are also used in parts of China to color various intoxicating liquors. The plant may have some potential in cosmetic skin care; for example, an extract from the flowers of Hibiscus rosa-sinensis has been shown to function as an anti-solar agent by absorbing ultraviolet radiation.

Cultivation 

Hibiscus rosa-sinensis is widely grown as an ornamental plant throughout the tropics and subtropics. As it does not tolerate temperatures below , in temperate regions it is best grown under glass. Plants grown in containers may be placed outside during the summer months and moved into shelter during the winter months.

Numerous cultivars exist, with flower colors ranging from white through yellow and orange to scarlet and shades of pink, with both single and double sets of petals. The cultivar 'Cooperi' has gained the Royal Horticultural Society's Award of Garden Merit.

National symbol 

Hibiscus rosa-sinensis is the national flower of Malaysia, called bunga raya in Malay. This can be translated in a number of ways, including "great flower" or "celebratory flower." Introduced into the Malay Peninsula in the 12th century, it was nominated as the national flower in the year 1958 by the Ministry of Agriculture amongst a few other flowers, namely ylang ylang, jasmine, lotus, rose, magnolia, and medlar. On July 28, 1960, it was declared by the government of Malaysia that Hibiscus rosa-sinensis would be the national flower. The red of the petals symbolizes the courage, life, and rapid growth of the Malaysian people, and the five petals represent the five Rukun Negara of Malaysia. The flower can be found imprinted on the notes and coins of the Malaysian ringgit.

Hibiscus rosa-sinensis is an unofficial national flower in Haiti, where it has been used as a symbol for the promotion of tourism. The flower is also the symbol of the Fusion of Haitian Social Democrats political party. It is known in Haitian Creole language as choeblack or rose kayenn. 

The yellow variety of the hibiscus is the official flower of Hawaiʻi, where it is often hybridized and is worn ornamentally in the hair and in lei. In Hawaiian, hibiscus is called aloalo.

Cultural references 
In March 1987, DPR Korea issued a postage stamp depicting Hibiscus rosa-sinensis.
On October 7, 2012, Sri Lanka issued a stamp set of four, one of which depicted a Hibiscus rosa-sinensis flower.

Gallery 
Cultivars with flowers of many colours are used as ornamental plants. Some have double petals or have differently shaped petals.

See also 
Hibiscus tea
Hibiscus

References

External links

Hibiscus rosa-sinensis(India)(http://in.pinterest.com/pin/
  (2005): Beija-flores (Aves, Trochilidae) e seus recursos florais em uma área urbana do Sul do Brasil [Hummingbirds (Aves, Trochilidae) and their flowers in an urban area of southern Brazil]. [Portuguese with English abstract] Revista Brasileira de Zoologia 22(1): 51–59.  PDF fulltext
 
 The International Hibiscus Society
 The American Hibiscus Society,()
 The Australian Hibiscus Society Inc.
 Hibiscusmania (France)
 Hibiscusfreunde (Germany)
 Hibiscus Forrest (Hungary)
 The Hibiscus (Gurgaon)

rosa-sinensis
Garden plants of Asia
Plants described in 1753
Taxa named by Carl Linnaeus
National symbols of Malaysia